Bilberries, or sometimes European blueberries, are a primarily Eurasian species of low-growing shrubs in the genus Vaccinium (family Ericaceae), bearing edible, dark blue berries. The species most often referred to is Vaccinium myrtillus L., but there are several other closely related species.

Etymology and common names 

The name "bilberry"  appears to have a Scandinavian origin, possibly from as early as 1577, being similar to the Danish word bølle for whortleberry with the addition of "berry". 
 
In Scandinavian languages bilberries have names that translate to "blueberry": blåbär in Swedish and blåbær in Danish and Norwegian. The bilberry (especially Vaccinium myrtillus) is also known by a number of other names including blaeberry  in Scottish and Northern English regional dialects and the Scots language, whortleberry  in southern England, and whimberry, wimberry, winberry or whinberry in Derbyshire, Lancashire, along the Anglo-Welsh border, and south Wales, amongst other places.

Description and species 

Bilberries – which are native to Europe – are different from North American blueberries, although the species are closely related and belong to the same genus, Vaccinium. Bilberry are non-climacteric fruits with a smooth, circular outline at the end opposite the stalk, whereas blueberries retain persistent sepals there, leaving a rough, star-shaped pattern of five flaps. Bilberries grow singly or in pairs rather than in clusters, as blueberries do, and blueberries have more evergreen leaves. Bilberries are dark in colour, and often appear near black with a slight shade of purple.

Bilberries and blueberries contain diverse anthocyanins, specifically anthocyanidins, including delphinidin and cyanidin glycosides.  While blueberry fruit pulp is light green, bilberry is red or purple. The high anthocyanin content may cause staining of the fingers, lips, and tongue.

Bilberries include several closely related species of the genus Vaccinium, including:
 Vaccinium myrtillus L. (bilberry)
 Vaccinium uliginosum L. (bog bilberry, bog blueberry, bog whortleberry, bog huckleberry, northern bilberry, ground hurts)
 Vaccinium cespitosum Michx. (dwarf bilberry)
 Vaccinium deliciosum Piper (Cascade bilberry)
 Vaccinium membranaceum (mountain bilberry, black mountain huckleberry, black huckleberry, twin-leaved huckleberry)
 Vaccinium ovalifolium (oval-leafed blueberry, oval-leaved bilberry, mountain blueberry, high-bush blueberry).

These species, with the exception of V. uliginosum, are part of section Myrtillus.

Wild and cultivated harvesting 

Bilberries are found in acidic, nutrient-poor soils throughout the temperate and subarctic regions of the world. They are difficult to grow and the fruit is small, so they are seldom cultivated. Fruits are mostly collected from wild plants growing on publicly accessible lands throughout northern and central Europe, where they are plentiful – for example, up to a fifth (17–21%) of the land area of Sweden contains bilberry bushes, where it is called blåbär (lit. "blueberry", which is a source of confusion with the American blueberry). Bilberries can be picked by a berry-picking rake like lingonberries, but are more susceptible to damage. They are softer and juicier than blueberries, making them difficult to transport. Because of these factors, fresh bilberries are only available from markets and gourmet stores. Frozen bilberries, however, are available all year round in many parts of Europe.

In Iceland, bilberries (known as aðalbláber, or "prime blueberry") grow predominantly in Westfjords and the surrounding area. In most of the country, the closely related bláber occupy the same habitat. Both species are commonly found growing with dwarf birch and crowberries. Wild growth is vast compared to the population of Iceland and wild harvesting is legal, and a popular activity in August when the berry season peaks.

In Ireland, the fruit is known as fraughan, from the Irish fraochán, and is traditionally gathered on the last Sunday in July, known as "Fraughan Sunday". Bilberries were also collected at the Celtic festival of Lughnasadh in August, the first traditional harvest festival of the year. The crop of bilberries was said to indicate how well the rest of the crops would fare in their harvests later in the year.

Bilberry is used as a food plant by the larvae of some Lepidoptera species (see the list of Lepidoptera that feed on Vaccinium).

Food 

The fruits are eaten fresh or made into jams, fools, juices or pies. In France and Italy they are used as a base for liqueurs and are a popular flavoring for sorbets and other desserts. In Brittany they are often used as a flavoring for crêpes, and in the Vosges and the Massif Central bilberry tart (tarte aux myrtilles) is a traditional dessert. In Romania they are used as a base for a liqueur called afinată – the name of the fruit in Romanian is afină. In the Nordic countries, they are eaten fresh or made into jams and other dishes, including bilberry pie (Finnish mustikkapiirakka, Swedish blåbärspaj) and blåbärssoppa, a bilberry soup served hot or cold. In Iceland they are popularly eaten with skyr (a cultured dairy product similar to yoghurt). In Poland, they are either eaten fresh (mixed with sugar), put into sweet buns as a filling (known as a jagodzianka and a popular bakery product during the summer), or used to make jams (known for their health benefits in the treatment of diarrhea). They are sometimes served with sweet śmietana (a soured cream).

Myths and research 
RAF pilots were said to have consumed bilberry jam during World War II to sharpen their night vision for missions in the dark, although there is no medical evidence for bilberries providing such an effect. One review of low-quality clinical research concluded there was no evidence that consuming bilberries improves night vision. Bilberries have been used in a variety of folklore and traditional medicine, but there are no proven health benefits or anti-disease effects from consuming them.

Diseases 
Bilberry plants can suffer from bilberry blight, caused by Phytophthora kernoviae. There have been severe outbreaks in Staffordshire, England.

References

External links 

Vaccinium
Medicinal plants
Berries
Plant common names